or "Soul of Super-alloy", is a popular line of adult collector's toys produced by the Japanese company Bandai.

The line, which began in 1997, focuses almost exclusively on mecha (robots) taken from various 1970s and 1980s anime series, although the line has diverged from this on a number of occasions, most notably the release of several mecha from the mid-1990s anime Neon Genesis Evangelion. More recently, the line has expanded further to include 1970s mecha from Super Sentai and other tokusatsu series, such as the Battle Fever Robo from Battle Fever J, Leopardon from the Japanese TV adaptation of Spider-Man and Gipsy Danger from Pacific Rim.

Also Bandai initiated the "F.A. (Full Action)" sub-line beginning with Voltes V; the F.A. sub-line sacrifices transformation and combination gimmicks in favor of anime-accurate proportions and dynamic articulation.

Lines

Soul of Chogokin

Accessories 
Special items released to complement or complete the previous Soul of Chogokin Figures.

Black versions, recolors and renewal versions 

Bandai released many variants of the original releases. Most are just repaints, while some of them have a totally different sculpt or add more features to the original SoC.

Limited items 

Even though they were never too difficult to find, the following versions were never released in shops. Most of them required the use of coupons found in manga/magazines/CDs. Some were released in fairs/exhibitions.

Special items 

The following special items were released in predetermined limited numbers. They have all reached incredibly high prices in secondary market.

Soul of Chogokin SPEC 

The SPEC series started in 2007 as an expansion series to the original SoC line, it is designed to showcase robot characters from the 1980s onward. This line is replaced by the Hi-Metal R line.

See also
 Mazinger Toy Lines
 Super Imaginative Chogokin
 Super Robot Chogokin
 Chogokin
 Godaikin
 Shogun Warriors

Notes

References

External links
Official Soul of Chogokin website (in Japanese. some wrong information exists)
Official Soul of Chogokin website (in English. Not updated as often)
japan-robot.com Soul of Chogokin forum

Action figures
Bandai brands
Japanese die-cast toys
Transforming toy robots
1990s toys
2000s toys
2010s toys
Toy mecha

it:Soul of Chogokin
ja:超合金魂